This is a list of members of the Tasmanian Legislative Council between 2005 and 2011. Terms of the Legislative Council did not coincide with Legislative Assembly elections, and members served six year terms, with a number of members facing election each year.

A redistribution in 2007–2008 saw three of the electorates renamed.

Elections

Members

Notes
  On 29 March 2007, the Labor member for Elwick, Terry Martin, was expelled from the parliamentary Labor party after voting against government legislation to fast-track planning approval for the proposed Bell Bay Pulp Mill. He has stated his intention to serve out the remainder of his term as an independent.
  In June 2009, Allison Ritchie, the Labor member for Pembroke, resigned. Liberal candidate Vanessa Goodwin won the resulting by-election on 1 August 2009.

Sources
 Parliament of Tasmania (2006). The Parliament of Tasmania from 1856

Members of Tasmanian parliaments by term
21st-century Australian politicians